Dennis P. Collins (June 12, 1924 – December 6, 2009) was an American Democratic party politician who served as the 24th mayor of Bayonne, New Jersey from 1974 until his retirement in 1990.

Biography
Born and raised in Bayonne, Collins attended St. Vincent De Paul grammar school and Holy Family Academy. He served in the United States Army for three years during World War II. Collins was elected to the Bayonne City Council in 1962, and served 12 years until being elected as mayor. His four terms in office make him the longest-serving mayor in Bayonne city history. Collins served as a Democratic elector from New Jersey in the 2000 Presidential election.

Legacy
Collins Park, the largest municipal park in Bayonne, is named in his honor. In 2007 the United States Congress named the city's Main Post Office in his honor.

References

2009 deaths
1924 births
Mayors of Bayonne, New Jersey
2000 United States presidential electors
20th-century American politicians